The Hong Kong Bird Watching Society (HKBWS) is an environmental non-governmental organization dedicated to the conservation of birds and their habitats in Hong Kong, a territory on the southern coast of China.  It is a BirdLife International affiliated organization.  The emblem of the HKBWS is the Chinese egret which visits Hong Kong on migration and used to breed in the territory.

Development 
The HKBWS was formed in 1957.  It publishes the annual Hong Kong Bird Report as well as regular bulletins.

In 1994, BirdLife International was established  and HKBWS became their Affiliate.

In 1999, the HKBWS China Conservation Fund was set up to support the birdwatching promotion and research works of birdwatchers and ornithologists in the China mainland.

In 2002, HKBWS was recognized as an approved public charitable institution.

As of 2013 it has over 1800 members, employs four full-time staff, holds regular meetings, conducts surveys and organizes birdwatching tours.

Activities
The activities are composed by three sections: Conversation, Research, and Education

As for conversation and research, It is involved in the conservation management of the Long Valley agricultural wetland where it monitors the birds. Its research programs include monitoring waterfowl at the Mai Po Marshes and Deep Bay, reviewing Hong Kong bird records and maintaining a checklist, studying the wintering ecology of black-faced spoonbills and conducting breeding bird surveys at the Tai Po Kau Forest Reserve.

The society is a pioneer of Citizen Science projects in Hong Kong, with their bird survey data going back to 1958, and they are now utilizing apps and carrying out a number of Citizen Science events such as their yearly sparrow census. The society also presents HKBWS views on local development plans and provides professional comments to the government on conservation action, birds and habitat protection. It hosts the Hong Kong Big Bird Race, an annual fund-raising activity for wildlife and habitat conservation of WWF HK. It became International representation in BirdLife International and Oriental Bird Club. The society also involves in Asia Red Data Book and Important Bird Area compilation.

HKBWS educates in two main ways: promoting bird watching activities and organizing indoors meetings. For bird watching Activities, HKBWS organizes bird watching activities every month at Hong Kong Birding Sites, including Hong Kong Island, Hong Kong Park, Lung Fu Shan, Aberdeen Reservoirs, The Peak, and Mount Davis, each of which targets at different bird species. The application is made on first come first serve basis. In addition, HKBWS holds indoor meetings regularly, and topics are usually related to birdwatching, ornithology and nature conservation. For more information about recent meetings, please check the schedule.

China Programme 
HKBWS has put much effort in its bird watching and conservation work in Mainland China. It has helped establish more than 20 bird watching societies in cities and provinces in the Chinese mainland and has trained hundreds of citizen conservationists to participate in bird surveys, the identification and management of important Bird Areas, and the conservation of threatened species.

The China Programme aims to:

 support the emergence of civil society organizations with an interest in, and concern for, China’s birds and the environment, given the condition that China has an incredibly diverse and rich biodiversity, but rapid economic development is placing increasing pressure on the country’s environment
 support the development of birdwatching and bird conservation in mainland China, with the participation of the Chinese public  
 raise awareness of the importance of birds and key areas for conservation
 build capacity for species and site conservation, education and organizational management 
 promote the development of bird monitoring and site-conservation activities

At least 23 emerging or established Chinese bird watching societies have taken part in activities organized by the Prorammme, including training workshops in waterbird and forest bird survey techniques, environmental education and important Bird Areas.

HKBWS was incorporated in 2002 as a limited company and was at the same time approved as a charitable organization of a public character.

References

Notes

Sources

External links
 HKBWS—Hong Kong Bird Watching Society website
Indoor Meetings--Hong Kong Bird Watching Society website

Bird conservation organizations

Animal welfare organisations based in Hong Kong
Nature conservation in Hong Kong
Ornithological organizations
Scientific organizations established in 1957
1957 establishments in Hong Kong